The Cistern of Aetius was an important Byzantine water reservoir in the city of Constantinople. Once one of the largest Byzantine cisterns, it is now a football stadium in Istanbul.

Location

It lies at the upper end of the valley which divides the fifth and the sixth hills of Constantinople.

History

Although according to a late tradition, the erection of the cistern, which lay in the fourteenth region of Constantinople, dates back to the reign of Emperor Valens (r. 364–78), it is ascertained that it was built in 421 by Aetius, praefectus urbi in Constantinople in 419 and praefectus praetorio Orientis in 425, under Emperor Theodosius II (r. 408–50). The cistern was confused in scholarship for a long time with the cistern of Bonus or with that of Aspar: only in recent times has its identification become certain. The giant tank was oriented parallel to one branch of the Mese, the main road of the city which connected the Gate of Charisios with the center of the city passing near the Church of the Holy Apostles, and was supplied by the water main connected to the Valens Aqueduct. Due to its huge dimensions, in the Byzantine age the reservoir was often used as reference point to locate other buildings, like the monasteries of Prodomos of Petra, of the Romans and of Mara.

After the Fall of Constantinople in 1453, the 16th-century French traveller Pierre Gilles reported that around 1540 the reservoir was already empty.  In the Ottoman period, as its Turkish name Çukurbostan ("hollow garden") betrays, the structure was used as vegetable garden.

Since the 1920s the structure has been turned into a sports ground, and since 1928 it hosts a football stadium, the Karagümrük (or Vefa, from the Vefa S.K. football team) stadium, which is the home stadium of Fatih Karagümrük SK team.

Identification problem
Attempts to identify the location of the Cistern of Aetius started quite late. The cistern has been successively identified with a cistern located near the Palace of the Porphyrogenitus, and now disappeared; the cistern located in the court of the little Kefeli Mosque; the vaulted cistern located southeast of the Çukurbostan of the Gate of Adrianople and known as Zina Yokusu Bodrumi. The key to the eventual establishment of its location lay in the information that the Cistern of Aetius was located near the monastery of Prodomos of Petra, which was surely in the valley dividing the fifth and the sixth hills: this led to its identification with the Çukurbostan near the Gate of Adrianople.

Description
It has been hypothesized that this reservoir was used to supply with water the moat of the city walls, but it is more plausible that it was a central reservoir whence the water was distributed in the city.

See also
List of Roman cisterns

References

Sources

Further reading

External links 

421 establishments
5th-century churches
Cisterns in Istanbul
Roman cisterns
Fatih
5th-century establishments in the Byzantine Empire
Football venues in Turkey